Edvin Frylén (born 23 December 1975) is a retired Swedish ice hockey player. Frylén was part of the Djurgården Swedish champions' team of 2001. Frylén made 140 Elitserien appearances for Djurgården.

Career statistics

References

External links

1975 births
Djurgårdens IF Hockey players
Hannover Scorpions players
Linköping HC players
Living people
Malmö Redhawks players
St. Louis Blues draft picks
Swedish ice hockey defencemen
VIK Västerås HK players